Always Was may refer to:

 Always Was (EP), a 2020 EP by Briggs
 "Always Was" (song), a 2001 song by Aaron Tippin
 "Always was, always will be", a slogan used by Indigenous Australians

See also
 Always Was, Is and Always Shall Be, a 1980 album by GG Allin
 Is and Always Was, a 2009 album by Daniel Johnston